Fritillaria fusca is an Asian species of herbaceous plant in the lily family Liliaceae, native to Tibet in China.

Fritillaria fusca is up to 22 cm tall. There is usually only one flower, bell-shaped, yellowish with purplish-brown markings.

References

fusca
Flora of Tibet
Plants described in 1943